The United Nations Educational, Scientific and Cultural Organization (UNESCO) World Heritage Sites are places of importance to cultural or natural heritage as described in the UNESCO World Heritage Convention, established in 1972. Montenegro, which declared independence in 2006 following the breakup of Yugoslavia and the dissolution of Serbia and Montenegro, acceded to the convention on 3 June 2006.

, there are four sites in Montenegro on the list and a further six on the tentative list (the official list of sites that may be considered for future submission). The first site in Montenegro to be added to the list was Natural and Culturo-Historical Region of Kotor, inscribed at the 3rd UNESCO session in 1979. Durmitor National Park was inscribed in 1980 and extended in 2005. These two sites were first added to the list when Montenegro was still a part of Yugoslavia. In addition, there are two transnational sites on the list. The site Stećci Medieval Tombstone Graveyards, inscribed in 2016, is shared with Bosnia and Herzegovina, Croatia, and Serbia, while the site Venetian Works of Defence between the 16th and 17th centuries is shared with Croatia and Italy. The Durmitor National Park is listed as a natural site while the other three are cultural sites, as determined by the organization's selection criteria.

At the time of its inscription in 1979, the site Natural and Culturo-Historical Region of Kotor was immediately listed as endangered, due to the damage it sustained in an earthquake registering 6.9 Mw that affected the area earlier that year. Following restoration, largely financed by the UNESCO, it was removed from the list of endangered sites in 2003.



World Heritage Sites 
UNESCO lists sites under ten criteria; each entry must meet at least one of the criteria. Criteria i through vi are cultural, and vii through x are natural.

Tentative list 
In addition to the sites inscribed on the World Heritage List, member states can maintain a list of tentative sites that they may consider for nomination. Nominations for the World Heritage List are only accepted if the site was previously listed on the tentative list. , Montenegro recorded six sites on its tentative list.

References

See also 
List of national parks of Montenegro

Montenegro
Montenegrin culture
World Heritage Sites
World Heritage Sites